Tonislav Yordanov (born 27 November 1998) is a Bulgarian professional footballer who plays as a forward for Beroe Stara Zagora.

Club career

Litex Lovech
Yordanov joined Litex Lovech in 2010 coming from Vidima-Rakovski. In 2014–15 season he became vice champion with the U17 team scoring 42 goals.

From the 2015–16 season he was promoted to the newly created second team of Litex in B Group. He made his debut for Litex II on 26 Juny 2015 in match against Dobrudzha Dobrich.

In the summer of 2015 he also joined the first team in the pre-season camp. He made his unofficial debut for the team against AC Omonia. Four days later he played and in the match against Vereya.
He made his official debut for the team in a cup match on 22 September 2015 against Lokomotiv 2012 Mezdra. He also scored his debut goal for the team.

CSKA Sofia
In the summer of 2016 he moved to CSKA Sofia alongside most of the Litex players.

Yordanov made his official debut for the team in First League on 31 May 2017 against Dunav Ruse.
He signed his first professional contract with the team on 6 June 2017 alongside Slavi Petrov and Angel Lyaskov.

Litex Lovech (loan)
In July 2017, Yordanov was loaned to Litex Lovech.

Beroe
In December 2022, Yordanov signed for Beroe Stara Zagora.

International career
On 5 September 2019, he scored three goals for the Bulgaria U21 team in the 4:0 away win over Estonia U21 in a 2021 UEFA Euro qualifier.

Style of play

Yordanov has been described as having an eye for goal and being very good from set pieces.

Career statistics

Club

References

External links 

1998 births
Living people
Bulgarian footballers
Bulgaria under-21 international footballers
Bulgaria youth international footballers
Association football forwards
First Professional Football League (Bulgaria) players
Second Professional Football League (Bulgaria) players
PFC Litex Lovech players
PFC CSKA Sofia players
SFC Etar Veliko Tarnovo players
FC Arda Kardzhali players
PFC Beroe Stara Zagora players
People from Sevlievo